Magnus Huss (22 October 1807 – 22 April 1890) was a Swedish physician and professor, knighted with his name retained. He is known for coining the term alcoholism in 1849, which he used to refer to the pathological changes in the body due to long-term alcohol intoxication. He has also been described the "forefather of Swedish internal medicine" and the "founder of clinical education in [Sweden]".

Biography

Background, education, and career 
Magnus Huss was born in Torp, Medelpad, Sweden. He was the son of vicar Johan Huss and Catharina Magdalena Hellzén.

Huss became a student in Uppsala in 1824, received his bachelor's degree in philosophy in 1829, master's in philosophy in 1830, bachelor's in medicine in 1832, licentiate degree in medicine in 1834, master's in surgery in 1835 and doctor of medicine the same year. The year before, Huss had already been appointed assistant physician at the Serafimerlasarettet in Stockholm and became assistant professor of medicine and surgery at the Karolinska Institute in 1835. After spending 1837–1838 in Germany, Austria and France for his scientific studies, he was appointed assistant chief physician at the Serafimerlasarettet in 1839 with the support of anatomist Anders Retzius and surgeon . On 1 August that year he opened the first real medical clinic in Sweden. At this clinic the methods of physical examination were introduced, including auscultation and percussion, in conjunction with a more careful study of pathological anatomy; and by the extraordinary ability and perseverance which Huss developed during his long service as director of the clinic, the above date may be said to form a turning point in the history of Swedish medicine.

In 1840, Huss was appointed senior physician at the Serafimerlasarettet and temporary professor, and in 1846 tenured professor at the Karolinska Institute. While working there, he contributed to the founding of what became the Swedish Dental Association. He resigned from his position as chairman of the Board of Health in 1864, but remained general director of the hospitals until 1876. During his time as a teacher, Huss also engaged in extensive medical consultancy work.

Writing 
Huss was also active as a scientific writer. In 1840 he published  (A summary of the medical care in the medico-clinical department of the Serafimerlasarettet during the last five months of 1839). In 1845 he published his  (Observations on typhoid fever). His 1849 work also includes an early description of symptoms similar to restless legs syndrome, "more unpleasant than painful," "which usually are associated with the so-called restlessness, when the sick constantly tries to change the position of legs, especially when the evening comes or at night." For the benefit of the first of these works to American military physicians during the American Civil War, the United States Secretary of War expressed in an official letter his grateful appreciation.

Description of alcoholism 
Huss described alcoholism as follows in his 1849 work, Alcoholismus chronicus:

Public health 
The observation of chronic alcoholism led Huss to fight against drinking with all his conviction. His work played a large role in the passage of the 1855 law banning home distilling. His 1887  (Warning against the use of spirits and drinking) was to be posted in the classrooms of public schools and folk schools, according to a royal decree of 10 February 1888. In 1865, Huss published the popular work  (On coffee; its use and abuse).

At the same time he exercised great influence on a variety of other matters of a hygienic and philanthropic nature. Thus it was at his and 's instigation that Crown Princess Louise's Hospital for Sick Children came into being. He was also energetically active in the reorganization of the Allmänna Barnhuset in Stockholm, the establishment of children's nurseries and improved legislation concerning the care of the mentally ill. He took the initiative for Sweden's first children's nursery, inspired by similar establishments in Paris.

Entrusted and honorary assignments 
Huss was a member of the Royal Swedish Academy of Sciences (1844), member of the Royal Society of Arts and Sciences in Gothenburg (1846; honorary member 1859), member of the Royal Society of Sciences in Uppsala (1850; honorary member 1885) and of the Royal Physiographic Society in Lund (1878).

In 1857 he was raised to the rank of nobleman and served as a member of the knighthood and nobility in the Riksdag of the Estates of 1859–1860, 1862–1863 and 1865–1866. In 1866 he moved to Östergötland and in 1873–1874 he was a member of the second chamber of the Riksdag for the constituency of Åkerbo, Bankekind and Hanekind. From 1874 to 1883 he lived at Kvistrum in the parish of Gärdserum in northern Kalmar County, but returned to Stockholm in the latter year.

Excerpts from Huss's surviving manuscript were published in 1891 under the title  (Some sketches and moments from my life).

 is the name of a street in the Saint Göran Hospital area in Stockholm.

Nobility 
Huss was knighted in 1857 with his name retained and was introduced in 1858 at the House of Nobility under number 2327.

Family 
He married baroness Christina Maria Charlotta Bergenstråhle in 1857. Huss' only child, Helge Magnus Gabriel Huss (1859–1874), died before his father, upon which the family lineage died out.

Huss died in Stockholm in 1890 and is buried at Norra begravningsplatsen.

References

Notes

Sources 

1807 births
1890 deaths
19th-century Swedish physicians
Academic staff of the Karolinska Institute
Burials at Norra begravningsplatsen
Knights of the Order of Charles XIII
Members of the Royal Society of Sciences and Letters in Gothenburg
Members of the Royal Physiographic Society in Lund
Members of the Royal Swedish Academy of Sciences
Members of the Andra kammaren
Members of the Royal Society of Sciences in Uppsala